The Road to Albertane is a 1998 documentary that follows the American teenage band Hanson on their first major concert tour, the Albertane Tour.

Charts

References

External links
 

1998 films
Documentary films about pop music and musicians
American documentary films
Hanson (band)
1990s American films